Glenahiry is a barony in County Waterford, Republic of Ireland.

Etymology
Glenahiry barony is derived from the Irish for "valley of the River Nier", which is called An Uidhir ("dun, brown") in Irish. The Nier joins the River Suir at Ballymakee.

Geography
Glenahiry is located in northern County Waterford, east of the River Suir and west of the Comeragh Mountains. The Nier Valley Woodlands are a Special Area of Conservation.

History

Glenahiry was the ancient territory of the Mac Cairbre (Carbery).

Glenahiry was established as a barony by 1672.

List of settlements

Below is a list of settlements in Glenahiry barony:

Ballymacarbry

References

Baronies of County Waterford